Citizen K is a 2019 documentary film about Mikhail Khodorkovsky, written and directed by Alex Gibney. It is a film about post-Soviet Russia featuring Khodorkovsky, Anton Drel, Maria Logan, Alexei Navalny, Tatyana Lysova, Leonid Nevzlin, Igor Malashenko and Derk Sauer.

Citizen K was financed by Amazon. It had its world premiere at Venice Film Festival and was part of the official selection at Venice Film Festival, Toronto International Film Festival and BFI London Film Festival.

The film received generally positive reviews from critics. The website's critics consensus reads: "Citizen K sees documentarian Alex Gibney training his sights on post-Soviet Russia, with engrossing -- and unsettling -- results." Gibney received a nomination at the 72nd Writers Guild of America Awards for Best Documentary Screenplay, losing the award to his own film The Inventor: Out for Blood in Silicon Valley.

References

External links
 
 
 

2019 films
2019 documentary films
Documentary films about Russia
Films directed by Alex Gibney
American documentary films
Mikhail Khodorkovsky
2010s English-language films
2010s American films